The men's individual table tennis – Class 6 tournament at the 2016 Summer Paralympics in Rio de Janeiro took place from 7 to 18 September 2016 at Riocentro Pavilion 3. Classes 6–10 are for athletes with a physical impairment who compete from a standing position; the lower the number, the greater the impact the impairment has on an athlete's ability to compete.

In the preliminary stage, athletes competed in five groups of three. Winners and runners-up of each group qualified for the next stage.

Results
All times are local time in UTC-3.

Final Rounds

Top half

Bottom half

Preliminary round

Group A

8 September, 11:40

9 September, 11:00

9 September, 18:40

Group B

8 September, 12:20

9 September, 11:00

9 September, 18:40

Group C

8 September, 12:20

9 September, 11:40

9 September, 18:40

Group D

8 September, 12:20

9 September, 11:40

9 September, 19:20

Group E

8 September, 12:20

9 September, 11:40

9 September, 19:20

References

MI06